Çine is a town and a district of Aydın Province, in the Aegean region of Turkey,  from the city of Aydın, on the road to Muğla.

History 
Throughout the ages this area has belonged to the Ionians, Caria, Lydians, Persia, Ancient Rome and Byzantium, was viciously fought over by the Seljuk Turks and Byzantines, eventually ending up in the hands of the Anatolian beylik of the Menteşe. The original settlement is 8 km south of the modern town.

In 1426 the area was brought into the Ottoman Empire by Murat II. From 1867 until 1922, Çine was part of Aidin Vilayet. The town grew in the 19th century when following the Russo-Turkish War of 1877-1878 displaced Turks from Russia were resettled here by Sultan Abdul Hamid II. The town was destroyed by fire in 1900 and rebuilt.

Geography 
Formerly known as Kıroba, Çine is an attractive rural district in the southern part of the valley of the Büyük Menderes River, on the southern flank of Madran mountain. The local economy depends on mining of quartz and amethyst, forestry and agriculture. A dam is being built for a hydro-electric power station, after which the reservoir will be used to irrigate the surrounding farmland, however this project, which began in 1995, was still incomplete as of 2006. The local cuisine features köfte and fish.

Çine itself is a small town of 20443 people.

References

External links 
 the district governor 

Populated places in Aydın Province
Districts of Aydın Province
Çine District